Sa'fan District is a district of the Sana'a Governorate, Yemen. As of 2003, the district had a population of 33,722 inhabitants.

References

Districts of Sanaa Governorate
Sa'fan District